Alexander Bolewski (1892–1981) was a pioneer Australian rugby league player who played in the 1910s and 1920s.

Background
Bolewski was born at Ballina, New South Wales on 24 January 1892.

Playing career
Alex (or Alec) Bolewski, grew up in Glebe and played for the Glebe Dirty Reds for four seasons between 1914 and 1919, although he missed the 1917 and 1918 seasons due to active service in World War I.

He enlisted in the AIF in 1916, and joined the 1st Light Horse Field Ambulance, 27th reinforcements. His unit was sent to Europe in 1917, and, while surviving the war, he did not return to Australia until April 1919, although he resumed his rugby league career soon afterward, playing 13 games that season.  He was the brother of fellow Glebe player Henry Bolewski.

In 1920 he moved to Newtown and he played five seasons there between 1920 and 1924, often as captain.

Bolewski represented the Metropolis (Sydney) team in 1915, and represented New South Wales on one occasion in 1919.

One of the rugby leagues great characters and pioneers, Alex Bolewski died at Undercliffe, New South Wales on 16 July 1981, aged 89.

References

1892 births
1981 deaths
Australian military personnel of World War I
Australian people of Polish descent
Australian rugby league players
Glebe rugby league players
New South Wales rugby league team players
Newtown Jets players
Rugby league players from Ballina, New South Wales